Bare lymphocyte syndrome is a condition caused by mutations in certain genes of the major histocompatibility complex or involved with the processing and presentation of MHC molecules. It is a form of severe combined immunodeficiency.

Presentation
The bare lymphocyte syndrome, type II (BLS II) is a rare recessive genetic condition in which a group of genes called major histocompatibility complex class II (MHC class II) are not expressed.

The result is that the immune system is severely compromised and cannot effectively fight infection.  Clinically, this is similar to severe combined immunodeficiency (SCID), in which lymphocyte precursor cells are improperly formed. Absolute T-cell count is also reduced, due to impaired development with the absence of MHC II.

TAP (transporter associated with antigen presentation) deficiency syndrome is the best characterized of BLS I. Symptoms can include recurrent bacterial infections of the respiratory tract and chronic skin lesions. Bronchiectasis and respiratory failure and complete destruction of the nose and cerebral abscess are severe complications.

Diarrhea can be among the associated conditions.

Genetics

BLS II
The genetic basis for BLSII is not due to defects in the MHC II genes themselves. The genetic basis is the result of mutations in genes that code for proteins (transcription factors) that normally regulate the expression (gene transcription) of the MHC II genes. That is, one of the several proteins that are required to switch on MHC II genes in various cells types (primarily those in the immune system) is absent. The genes responsible were cloned by the laboratories of Bernard Mach in Switzerland and Jeremy Boss at Emory University in Atlanta, Georgia.

Mutation in any one of four genes can lead to BLS II.  The genes' names are:
 class II trans-activator (CIITA)
 regulatory factor of the Xbox 5 (RFX5)
 RFX-associated protein (RFXAP)
 RFX ankyrin repeats (RFXANK; also known as RFXB)

BLS I
BLS I, also called "HLA class I deficiency", which is much more rare, is associated with TAP2, TAP1, or TAPBP deficiencies. The TAP proteins are involved in pumping degraded cytosolic peptides across the endoplasmic reticulum membrane so they can bind HLA class I. Once the peptide:HLA class I complex forms, it is transported to the membrane of the cell. However, a defect in the TAP proteins prevents pumping of peptides into the endoplasmic reticulum so no peptide:HLA class I complexes form, and therefore, no HLA class I is expressed on the membrane. Just like BLS II, the defect isn't in the MHC protein, but rather another accessory protein.

Diagnosis

Classification
 Type 1: MHC class I
 Type 2: MHC class II

Treatment
Though BLSII is an attractive candidate for gene therapy, bone marrow transplant is currently the only treatment.

References

External links 

Autosomal recessive disorders
Combined T and B–cell immunodeficiencies
Noninfectious immunodeficiency-related cutaneous conditions
Syndromes